Teodoro Schmidt is a Chilean town and commune located in Cautín Province, Araucanía Region.

Demographics
According to data from the 2002 Census of Population and Housing, Teodoro Schmidt had 15,504 inhabitants; of these, 6,244 (40.3%) lived in urban areas and 9,260 (59.7%) in rural areas. At that time, there were 8,136 men and 7,368 women.

Administration
As a commune, Teodoro Schmidt is a third-level administrative division of Chile administered by a communal council, headed by an alcalde who is directly elected every four years. The 2016-2021 mayor is Alfredo Riquelme Arriagada.

Within the electoral divisions of Chile, Teodoro Schmidt belongs to the 51st electoral district and 15th senatorial constituency.

References

External links
  Municipality of Teodoro Schmidt

See also
 List of towns in Chile

Communes of Chile
Populated places in Cautín Province